This is a partial list of unnumbered minor planets for principal provisional designations assigned between 1 January and 31 December 1994. , a total of 96 bodies remain unnumbered for this period. Also see previous and next year.

A 

|- id="1994 AC5" bgcolor=#fefefe
| 0 ||  || MBA-I || 18.6 || data-sort-value="0.57" | 570 m || multiple || 1994–2020 || 12 Sep 2020 || 51 || align=left | Disc.: SpacewatchAdded on 17 January 2021 || 
|- id="1994 AX5" bgcolor=#E9E9E9
| 0 ||  || MBA-M || 16.51 || 1.5 km || multiple || 1994–2021 || 06 Nov 2021 || 147 || align=left | Disc.: SpacewatchAlt.: 2014 WN428 || 
|- id="1994 AF9" bgcolor=#fefefe
| 0 ||  || MBA-I || 18.70 || data-sort-value="0.54" | 540 m || multiple || 1994–2020 || 12 Sep 2020 || 65 || align=left | Disc.: Spacewatch || 
|}
back to top

B 

|- id="1994 BB" bgcolor=#FFC2E0
| 2 || 1994 BB || AMO || 23.5 || data-sort-value="0.071" | 71 m || multiple || 1994–2017 || 18 Feb 2017 || 58 || align=left | Disc.: Spacewatch || 
|}
back to top

C 

|- id="1994 CJ1" bgcolor=#FFC2E0
| 0 ||  || APO || 21.4 || data-sort-value="0.19" | 190 m || multiple || 1994–2016 || 10 Oct 2016 || 169 || align=left | Disc.: SpacewatchPotentially hazardous objectAMO at MPC || 
|- id="1994 CU4" bgcolor=#d6d6d6
| 0 ||  || MBA-O || 17.14 || 2.1 km || multiple || 1994–2021 || 08 Sep 2021 || 63 || align=left | Disc.: SpacewatchAdded on 22 July 2020Alt.: 2010 CV263 || 
|- id="1994 CW4" bgcolor=#E9E9E9
| – ||  || MBA-M || 17.0 || 1.2 km || single || 6 days || 16 Feb 1994 || 9 || align=left | Disc.: Spacewatch || 
|- id="1994 CY6" bgcolor=#E9E9E9
| 0 ||  || MBA-M || 17.7 || 1.2 km || multiple || 1994–2021 || 30 May 2021 || 69 || align=left | Disc.: Spacewatch || 
|}
back to top

E 

|- id="1994 EJ" bgcolor=#FA8072
| 3 || 1994 EJ || MCA || 19.1 || data-sort-value="0.45" | 450 m || multiple || 1994–2020 || 28 Apr 2020 || 56 || align=left | Disc.: Spacewatch || 
|- id="1994 EK" bgcolor=#FFC2E0
| 1 || 1994 EK || APO || 20.3 || data-sort-value="0.31" | 310 m || multiple || 1994–2013 || 14 Feb 2013 || 99 || align=left | Disc.: SpacewatchPotentially hazardous object || 
|- id="1994 EU" bgcolor=#FFC2E0
| 7 || 1994 EU || APO || 25.9 || data-sort-value="0.023" | 23 m || single || 12 days || 22 Mar 1994 || 16 || align=left | Disc.: Spacewatch || 
|- id="1994 ES1" bgcolor=#FFC2E0
| – ||  || APO || 28.5 || data-sort-value="0.0071" | 7 m || single || 1 day || 15 Mar 1994 || 13 || align=left | Disc.: Spacewatch || 
|- id="1994 ES2" bgcolor=#C2E0FF
| 3 ||  || TNO || 7.6 || 100 km || multiple || 1994–2015 || 18 Feb 2015 || 36 || align=left | Disc.: Mauna Kea Obs.LoUTNOs, cubewano (cold), BR-mag: 1.65 || 
|- id="1994 EW9" bgcolor=#fefefe
| 0 ||  || MBA-I || 17.79 || data-sort-value="0.82" | 820 m || multiple || 1994–2020 || 11 Oct 2020 || 117 || align=left | Disc.: Spacewatch || 
|}
back to top

F 

|- id="1994 FA" bgcolor=#FFC2E0
| 7 || 1994 FA || APO || 25.2 || data-sort-value="0.032" | 32 m || single || 4 days || 20 Mar 1994 || 15 || align=left | Disc.: SpacewatchAMO at MPC || 
|}
back to top

G 

|- id="1994 GK" bgcolor=#FFC2E0
| 8 || 1994 GK || APO || 24.2 || data-sort-value="0.051" | 51 m || single || 3 days || 10 Apr 1994 || 10 || align=left | Disc.: Spacewatch || 
|- id="1994 GL" bgcolor=#FFC2E0
| 3 || 1994 GL || ATE || 25.5 || data-sort-value="0.028" | 28 m || multiple || 1994–2020 || 06 Apr 2020 || 88 || align=left | Disc.: Spacewatch || 
|- id="1994 GV" bgcolor=#FFC2E0
| 7 || 1994 GV || APO || 27.4 || data-sort-value="0.012" | 12 m || single || 2 days || 15 Apr 1994 || 11 || align=left | Disc.: Spacewatch || 
|- id="1994 GB2" bgcolor=#fefefe
| 0 ||  || MBA-I || 18.43 || data-sort-value="0.61" | 610 m || multiple || 1994–2021 || 04 Oct 2021 || 57 || align=left | Disc.: Spacewatch || 
|- id="1994 GU2" bgcolor=#d6d6d6
| 0 ||  || MBA-O || 16.52 || 2.8 km || multiple || 1994–2021 || 09 Jun 2021 || 127 || align=left | Disc.: SpacewatchAdded on 22 July 2020Alt.: 2007 TQ494, 2009 AC7, 2010 LN139 || 
|- id="1994 GJ6" bgcolor=#fefefe
| 0 ||  || MBA-I || 18.68 || data-sort-value="0.55" | 550 m || multiple || 1994–2021 || 10 Sep 2021 || 57 || align=left | Disc.: SpacewatchAdded on 22 July 2020 || 
|- id="1994 GC12" bgcolor=#fefefe
| 0 ||  || MBA-I || 17.63 || data-sort-value="0.89" | 890 m || multiple || 1994–2021 || 29 Oct 2021 || 215 || align=left | Disc.: Spacewatch || 
|}
back to top

J 

|- id="1994 JB6" bgcolor=#E9E9E9
| 1 ||  || MBA-M || 18.38 || data-sort-value="0.68" | 680 m || multiple || 1994–2019 || 20 Aug 2019 || 28 || align=left | Disc.: SpacewatchAdded on 11 May 2021Alt.: 2019 KC16 || 
|- id="1994 JH7" bgcolor=#E9E9E9
| 0 ||  || MBA-M || 18.23 || data-sort-value="0.75" | 750 m || multiple || 1994–2022 || 20 Apr 2022 || 71 || align=left | Disc.: SpacewatchAdded on 11 May 2021Alt.: 2010 FN143 || 
|- id="1994 JO8" bgcolor=#d6d6d6
| E ||  || MBA-O || 18.0 || 1.4 km || single || 3 days || 08 May 1994 || 4 || align=left | Disc.: Mauna Kea Obs. || 
|}
back to top

N 

|- id="1994 NE" bgcolor=#FFC2E0
| 3 || 1994 NE || APO || 19.8 || data-sort-value="0.39" | 390 m || single || 26 days || 08 Jul 1994 || 37 || align=left | Disc.: Palomar Obs.Potentially hazardous object || 
|- id="1994 NK" bgcolor=#FFC2E0
| 0 || 1994 NK || AMO || 20.0 || data-sort-value="0.36" | 360 m || multiple || 1994–2019 || 04 Feb 2019 || 300 || align=left | Disc.: Spacewatch || 
|- id="1994 ND5" bgcolor=#E9E9E9
| 0 ||  || MBA-M || 16.98 || 1.7 km || multiple || 1994–2021 || 07 Oct 2021 || 185 || align=left | Disc.: La Silla Obs.Added on 22 July 2020Alt.: 2015 DS177 || 
|}
back to top

P 

|- id="1994 PC3" bgcolor=#E9E9E9
| 2 ||  || MBA-M || 17.8 || data-sort-value="0.82" | 820 m || multiple || 1994–2020 || 22 Jan 2020 || 95 || align=left | Disc.: La Silla Obs.Alt.: 2016 AW90 || 
|- id="1994 PY8" bgcolor=#E9E9E9
| 0 ||  || MBA-M || 17.1 || 1.6 km || multiple || 1994–2020 || 13 Jul 2020 || 47 || align=left | Disc.: La Silla Obs.Alt.: 2003 SF418, 2011 LN34 || 
|- id="1994 PF31" bgcolor=#fefefe
| 0 ||  || MBA-I || 17.75 || data-sort-value="0.84" | 840 m || multiple || 1994–2021 || 11 Jan 2021 || 158 || align=left | Disc.: La Silla Obs. || 
|}
back to top

R 

|- id="1994 RB" bgcolor=#FFC2E0
| 7 || 1994 RB || APO || 23.4 || data-sort-value="0.074" | 74 m || single || 2 days || 03 Sep 1994 || 21 || align=left | Disc.: Spacewatch || 
|- id="1994 RV1" bgcolor=#FA8072
| – ||  || MCA || 19.9 || data-sort-value="0.31" | 310 m || single || 23 days || 28 Sep 1994 || 9 || align=left | Disc.: Spacewatch || 
|- id="1994 RW1" bgcolor=#FA8072
| 0 ||  || MCA || 18.9 || data-sort-value="0.49" | 490 m || multiple || 1994–2021 || 13 Jun 2021 || 61 || align=left | Disc.: Spacewatch || 
|- id="1994 RH6" bgcolor=#fefefe
| 0 ||  || MBA-I || 18.90 || data-sort-value="0.49" | 490 m || multiple || 1994–2021 || 11 Oct 2021 || 101 || align=left | Disc.: SpacewatchAlt.: 2011 UO123 || 
|- id="1994 RS9" bgcolor=#E9E9E9
| 0 ||  || MBA-M || 17.84 || 1.1 km || multiple || 1994–2021 || 16 Feb 2021 || 78 || align=left | Disc.: Spacewatch || 
|- id="1994 RT14" bgcolor=#FA8072
| 3 ||  || MCA || 19.3 || data-sort-value="0.41" | 410 m || multiple || 1994–2021 || 08 Jun 2021 || 27 || align=left | Disc.: La Silla Obs.Alt.: 2018 LO4 || 
|- id="1994 RZ29" bgcolor=#E9E9E9
| 0 ||  || MBA-M || 17.60 || 1.7 km || multiple || 1994–2021 || 04 May 2021 || 95 || align=left | Disc.: Spacewatch || 
|- id="1994 RA30" bgcolor=#d6d6d6
| 0 ||  || MBA-O || 16.61 || 2.7 km || multiple || 1994–2020 || 15 May 2020 || 83 || align=left | Disc.: Spacewatch || 
|- id="1994 RB30" bgcolor=#d6d6d6
| 0 ||  || MBA-O || 17.3 || 1.9 km || multiple || 1994–2019 || 09 Jan 2019 || 38 || align=left | Disc.: SpacewatchAdded on 22 July 2020 || 
|- id="1994 RD30" bgcolor=#d6d6d6
| 0 ||  || MBA-O || 17.53 || 1.7 km || multiple || 1994–2021 || 27 Nov 2021 || 98 || align=left | Disc.: SpacewatchAdded on 21 August 2021Alt.: 2010 HL93 || 
|- id="1994 RE30" bgcolor=#E9E9E9
| 1 ||  || MBA-M || 18.17 || 1.3 km || multiple || 1994–2021 || 13 Nov 2021 || 51 || align=left | Disc.: SpacewatchAdded on 21 August 2021 || 
|}
back to top

S 

|- id="1994 SP1" bgcolor=#fefefe
| 0 ||  || MBA-I || 19.01 || data-sort-value="0.47" | 470 m || multiple || 1994–2019 || 01 Jul 2019 || 59 || align=left | Disc.: SpacewatchAlt.: 2010 UB20 || 
|- id="1994 SU1" bgcolor=#fefefe
| 0 ||  || MBA-I || 18.48 || data-sort-value="0.60" | 600 m || multiple || 1994–2021 || 26 Nov 2021 || 129 || align=left | Disc.: SpacewatchAlt.: 2010 OX93, 2013 EJ54 || 
|- id="1994 SS3" bgcolor=#fefefe
| 0 ||  || MBA-I || 19.05 || data-sort-value="0.46" | 460 m || multiple || 1994–2020 || 20 Oct 2020 || 117 || align=left | Disc.: SpacewatchAlt.: 2007 TJ26 || 
|- id="1994 SS4" bgcolor=#fefefe
| 0 ||  || MBA-I || 18.36 || data-sort-value="0.63" | 630 m || multiple || 1994–2021 || 06 Jan 2021 || 54 || align=left | Disc.: Spacewatch || 
|- id="1994 SU4" bgcolor=#E9E9E9
| 0 ||  || MBA-M || 18.38 || data-sort-value="0.89" | 890 m || multiple || 1994–2021 || 28 Nov 2021 || 50 || align=left | Disc.: SpacewatchAdded on 22 July 2020 || 
|- id="1994 SM6" bgcolor=#E9E9E9
| 1 ||  || MBA-M || 18.77 || data-sort-value="0.80" | 730 m || multiple || 1994–2020 || 19 Nov 2020 || 59 || align=left | Disc.: SpacewatchAdded on 17 June 2021Alt.: 2020 UT31 || 
|- id="1994 SX6" bgcolor=#fefefe
| 0 ||  || MBA-I || 19.15 || data-sort-value="0.44" | 440 m || multiple || 1994–2020 || 08 Dec 2020 || 50 || align=left | Disc.: Spacewatch || 
|- id="1994 SJ8" bgcolor=#E9E9E9
| 0 ||  || MBA-M || 18.5 || data-sort-value="0.84" | 840 m || multiple || 1994–2020 || 14 Dec 2020 || 54 || align=left | Disc.: SpacewatchAdded on 17 January 2021Alt.: 2020 WQ12 || 
|- id="1994 SF13" bgcolor=#E9E9E9
| 3 ||  || MBA-M || 18.1 || 1.0 km || multiple || 1994–2020 || 17 Dec 2020 || 42 || align=left | Disc.: SpacewatchAdded on 17 January 2021 || 
|}
back to top

T 

|- id="1994 TA" bgcolor=#C7FF8F
| 2 || 1994 TA || CEN || 11.5 || 28 km || multiple || 1994–1998 || 19 Oct 1998 || 27 || align=left | Disc.: Mauna Kea Obs., BR-mag: 1.98; taxonomy: RR || 
|- id="1994 TG" bgcolor=#C2E0FF
| E || 1994 TG || TNO || 7.0 || 204 km || single || 3 days || 06 Oct 1994 || 8 || align=left | Disc.: Mauna Kea Obs.LoUTNOs, cubewano (hot) || 
|- id="1994 TH" bgcolor=#C2E0FF
| E || 1994 TH || TNO || 7.0 || 166 km || single || 3 days || 06 Oct 1994 || 6 || align=left | Disc.: Mauna Kea Obs.LoUTNOs, other TNO || 
|- id="1994 TA2" bgcolor=#FFC2E0
| 6 ||  || AMO || 20.3 || data-sort-value="0.31" | 310 m || single || 18 days || 27 Oct 1994 || 28 || align=left | Disc.: Spacewatch || 
|- id="1994 TE2" bgcolor=#FFC2E0
| 7 ||  || AMO || 22.7 || data-sort-value="0.10" | 100 m || single || 2 days || 13 Oct 1994 || 15 || align=left | Disc.: Spacewatch || 
|- id="1994 TG2" bgcolor=#C2E0FF
| – ||  || TNO || 7.0 || 137 km || single || 32 days || 09 Nov 1994 || 8 || align=left | Disc.: La Silla Obs.LoUTNOs, cubewano? || 
|- id="1994 TK5" bgcolor=#d6d6d6
| 0 ||  || MBA-O || 16.92 || 2.3 km || multiple || 1994–2021 || 15 Apr 2021 || 135 || align=left | Disc.: SpacewatchAlt.: 2014 WX413 || 
|- id="1994 TZ5" bgcolor=#d6d6d6
| 0 ||  || HIL || 15.9 || 3.7 km || multiple || 1994–2018 || 18 Oct 2018 || 56 || align=left | Disc.: SpacewatchAlt.: 2010 MW144 || 
|- id="1994 TO8" bgcolor=#E9E9E9
| 0 ||  || MBA-M || 18.1 || 1.0 km || multiple || 1994–2018 || 20 Jan 2018 || 37 || align=left | Disc.: Spacewatch || 
|- id="1994 TM9" bgcolor=#E9E9E9
| 0 ||  || MBA-M || 17.20 || 1.1 km || multiple || 1994–2021 || 12 May 2021 || 151 || align=left | Disc.: SpacewatchAlt.: 2015 RW284 || 
|- id="1994 TH11" bgcolor=#E9E9E9
| 0 ||  || MBA-M || 17.8 || 1.2 km || multiple || 1994–2015 || 21 Aug 2015 || 39 || align=left | Disc.: Spacewatch || 
|- id="1994 TN12" bgcolor=#E9E9E9
| 0 ||  || MBA-M || 18.7 || data-sort-value="0.76" | 760 m || multiple || 1994–2020 || 15 Oct 2020 || 39 || align=left | Disc.: SpacewatchAdded on 17 January 2021 || 
|- id="1994 TP12" bgcolor=#fefefe
| 3 ||  || MBA-I || 18.8 || data-sort-value="0.52" | 520 m || multiple || 1994–2013 || 24 Nov 2013 || 30 || align=left | Disc.: Spacewatch || 
|- id="1994 TZ12" bgcolor=#E9E9E9
| 0 ||  || MBA-M || 17.12 || 1.6 km || multiple || 1994–2021 || 07 Feb 2021 || 122 || align=left | Disc.: SpacewatchAlt.: 2007 TY104 || 
|- id="1994 TR13" bgcolor=#fefefe
| 0 ||  || MBA-I || 19.76 || data-sort-value="0.33" | 330 m || multiple || 1994–2019 || 29 Jun 2019 || 35 || align=left | Disc.: Spacewatch || 
|- id="1994 TY17" bgcolor=#d6d6d6
| 0 ||  || MBA-O || 17.2 || 2.0 km || multiple || 1994–2021 || 08 May 2021 || 60 || align=left | Disc.: SpacewatchAdded on 17 June 2021 || 
|- id="1994 TA18" bgcolor=#fefefe
| 0 ||  || MBA-I || 18.07 || data-sort-value="0.72" | 720 m || multiple || 1994–2021 || 09 Dec 2021 || 120 || align=left | Disc.: Spacewatch || 
|- id="1994 TC18" bgcolor=#d6d6d6
| 0 ||  || MBA-O || 17.03 || 2.2 km || multiple || 1994–2021 || 03 May 2021 || 43 || align=left | Disc.: SpacewatchAdded on 17 January 2021 || 
|}
back to top

U 

|- id="1994 US" bgcolor=#FFC2E0
| 6 || 1994 US || AMO || 21.0 || data-sort-value="0.22" | 220 m || single || 13 days || 11 Nov 1994 || 18 || align=left | Disc.: Spacewatch || 
|- id="1994 UR3" bgcolor=#d6d6d6
| 0 ||  || MBA-O || 17.17 || 2.0 km || multiple || 1994–2021 || 11 Jan 2021 || 121 || align=left | Disc.: SpacewatchAdded on 17 January 2021Alt.: 2017 FA154, 2017 FS182 || 
|- id="1994 UE5" bgcolor=#d6d6d6
| 1 ||  || MBA-O || 17.62 || 1.6 km || multiple || 1994–2022 || 16 Nov 2022 || 33 || align=left | Disc.: SpacewatchAdded on 22 July 2020 || 
|- id="1994 UB9" bgcolor=#E9E9E9
| 0 ||  || MBA-M || 17.11 || 1.1 km || multiple || 1994–2021 || 12 May 2021 || 104 || align=left | Disc.: SpacewatchAlt.: 2013 JH16 || 
|- id="1994 UF10" bgcolor=#E9E9E9
| 0 ||  || MBA-M || 17.97 || 1.4 km || multiple || 1994–2021 || 10 Sep 2021 || 46 || align=left | Disc.: Spacewatch || 
|- id="1994 UJ10" bgcolor=#FA8072
| – ||  || MCA || 19.5 || data-sort-value="0.70" | 700 m || single || 3 days || 01 Nov 1994 || 9 || align=left | Disc.: Spacewatch || 
|- id="1994 UX10" bgcolor=#E9E9E9
| 0 ||  || MBA-M || 17.73 || 1.2 km || multiple || 1994–2020 || 07 Dec 2020 || 90 || align=left | Disc.: SpacewatchAdded on 17 January 2021Alt.: 2015 PY100 || 
|- id="1994 UG13" bgcolor=#fefefe
| 0 ||  || MBA-I || 17.87 || data-sort-value="0.79" | 790 m || multiple || 1994–2022 || 05 Jan 2022 || 91 || align=left | Disc.: Spacewatch || 
|- id="1994 UH13" bgcolor=#d6d6d6
| 0 ||  || MBA-O || 16.58 || 2.7 km || multiple || 1994–2020 || 22 Apr 2020 || 87 || align=left | Disc.: Spacewatch || 
|- id="1994 UJ13" bgcolor=#d6d6d6
| 0 ||  || MBA-O || 16.60 || 2.7 km || multiple || 1994–2021 || 09 Sep 2021 || 102 || align=left | Disc.: SpacewatchAlt.: 2011 UA148 || 
|- id="1994 UK13" bgcolor=#E9E9E9
| 0 ||  || MBA-M || 18.02 || 1.0 km || multiple || 1994–2022 || 27 Jan 2022 || 68 || align=left | Disc.: SpacewatchAdded on 22 July 2020 || 
|}
back to top

V 

|- id="1994 VM4" bgcolor=#E9E9E9
| 0 ||  || MBA-M || 17.82 || 1.1 km || multiple || 1994–2022 || 27 Jan 2022 || 86 || align=left | Disc.: Spacewatch || 
|- id="1994 VC6" bgcolor=#fefefe
| 0 ||  || MBA-I || 18.62 || data-sort-value="0.56" | 560 m || multiple || 1994–2021 || 19 Mar 2021 || 83 || align=left | Disc.: SpacewatchAlt.: 2003 QM82, 2018 FX19 || 
|- id="1994 VH8" bgcolor=#FFC2E0
| 5 ||  || APO || 27.7 || data-sort-value="0.010" | 10 m || single || 0 day || 01 Nov 1994 || 5 || align=left | Disc.: Spacewatch || 
|- id="1994 VA9" bgcolor=#d6d6d6
| 0 ||  || MBA-O || 16.75 || 2.5 km || multiple || 1994–2021 || 30 Nov 2021 || 87 || align=left | Disc.: SpacewatchAdded on 21 August 2021 || 
|}
back to top

W 

|- id="1994 WY1" bgcolor=#FA8072
| 1 ||  || MCA || 18.8 || data-sort-value="0.73" | 730 m || multiple || 1994–2019 || 29 Sep 2019 || 114 || align=left | Disc.: SpacewatchAlt.: 2015 RY30 || 
|- id="1994 WZ1" bgcolor=#FA8072
| 0 ||  || MCA || 18.92 || data-sort-value="0.49" | 490 m || multiple || 1994–2021 || 12 Jan 2021 || 106 || align=left | Disc.: Spacewatch || 
|- id="1994 WZ2" bgcolor=#FA8072
| 2 ||  || MCA || 17.9 || 1.5 km || multiple || 1990–1999 || 05 Oct 1999 || 40 || align=left | Disc.: Siding Spring || 
|- id="1994 WT6" bgcolor=#fefefe
| 0 ||  || MBA-I || 17.86 || data-sort-value="0.80" | 800 m || multiple || 1994–2022 || 07 Jan 2022 || 83 || align=left | Disc.: Spacewatch || 
|- id="1994 WR12" bgcolor=#FFC2E0
| 0 ||  || ATE || 22.41 || data-sort-value="0.12" | 120 m || multiple || 1994–2022 || 25 Jan 2022 || 103 || align=left | Disc.: Palomar Obs. || 
|}
back to top

X 

|- id="1994 XG" bgcolor=#FFC2E0
| 4 || 1994 XG || APO || 18.6 || data-sort-value="0.68" | 680 m || multiple || 1994–2019 || 05 Jan 2019 || 59 || align=left | Disc.: Spacewatch || 
|- id="1994 XM1" bgcolor=#FFC2E0
| 3 ||  || APO || 28.2 || data-sort-value="0.0081" | 8 m || single || 0 day || 09 Dec 1994 || 10 || align=left | Disc.: Spacewatch || 
|- id="1994 XP2" bgcolor=#E9E9E9
| 0 ||  || MBA-M || 17.72 || 1.2 km || multiple || 1994–2022 || 25 Jan 2022 || 55 || align=left | Disc.: SpacewatchAdded on 17 January 2021 || 
|- id="1994 XX3" bgcolor=#E9E9E9
| 0 ||  || MBA-M || 16.9 || 1.8 km || multiple || 1994–2021 || 06 Jan 2021 || 78 || align=left | Disc.: SpacewatchAdded on 9 March 2021Alt.: 2007 XN57 || 
|- id="1994 XL6" bgcolor=#E9E9E9
| 0 ||  || MBA-M || 16.99 || 2.2 km || multiple || 1994–2021 || 06 Nov 2021 || 178 || align=left | Disc.: Spacewatch || 
|}
back to top

Y 

|- id="1994 YE4" bgcolor=#E9E9E9
| 1 ||  || MBA-M || 17.41 || data-sort-value="0.98" | 980 m || multiple || 1994–2021 || 07 Nov 2021 || 58 || align=left | Disc.: Spacewatch || 
|- id="1994 YU4" bgcolor=#d6d6d6
| 0 ||  || MBA-O || 16.32 || 3.0 km || multiple || 1994–2021 || 19 Nov 2021 || 156 || align=left | Disc.: Spacewatch || 
|}
back to top

References 
 

Lists of unnumbered minor planets